The Mayor of Pristina (Albanian: Prishtinë; Serbian: Приштина or Priština) is the head of the City of Pristina (capital of Kosovo). The mayor acts on behalf of the city and performs the executive function in the City of Pristina. In the Preliminary results of the 2011 census the population of Pristina was numbered around 198,000. The majority of population is Albanian, but there are also smaller communities including Bosniaks, Serbs, Romani and others. The surface of Pristina is 854 km2. Pristina is known as the center of cultural, economical and political developments. Since 2021 the current Mayor is Përparim Rama. The city is home of University of Pristina, Pristina International Airport Adem Jashari, the Government Building and the Assembly of Kosovo.

Office
According to the current legislation, the Mayor is elected along with members of the City Assembly at the direct secret ballot for the period of four years. The Mayor may not be a councilor of the City Assembly.

List of mayors

References

External links
 

 
Mayors of places in Kosovo